Academic ranks in Serbia are the titles, relative importance and power of professors, researchers, and administrative personnel held in academia.

References

Academic ranks
Education in Serbia
Academia in Serbia